A gorsedd (plural gorseddau) is a community or meeting of modern-day bards. The word is of Welsh origin, meaning "throne". It is spelled gorsedh in Cornish and goursez in Breton.

When the term is used without qualification, it usually refers to the Gorsedd Cymru, the National Gorsedd of Wales. However, other gorseddau exist, such as the Cornish Gorsedh Kernow, the Breton Goursez Vreizh and Gorsedd y Wladfa, in the Welsh Settlement in Patagonia.

Purpose

Gorseddau exist to promote literary scholarship and the creation of poetry and music. As part of this, their most visible activity can be seen at Eisteddfodau – Welsh language festivals.

History

Gorsedd Cymru was originally founded as Gorsedd Beirdd Ynys Prydain (later renamed Gorsedd Cymru) in 1792 by Edward Williams, commonly known as Iolo Morganwg, who also invented much of its ritual, supposedly based on the activities of the ancient Celtic Druidry. Nowadays, much of its ritual has Christian influence, and were given further embellishment in the 1930s by Cynan (later Archdruid 1950–1954 and 1963–1966). The Gorsedd made its first appearance at an Eisteddfod at the Ivy Bush Inn in Carmarthen in 1819, and its close association with the Festival has remained. It is an association of poets, writers, musicians, artists and individuals who have made a significant and distinguished contribution to Welsh language, literature, and culture. 

The fictitious origin of these ceremonies was established by Professor G.J. Williams in works touching on Iolo Morganwg.

In 1999, the centenary of early Gaelic revival poet and Easter Rising leader Patrick Pearse's initiation into the Gorsedd at the 1899 Pan Celtic Eisteddfod in Cardiff (where he took the Bardic name of Areithiwr) was marked by the unveiling of a plaque at the Consulate General of the Irish Republic in Wales.

Symbolism

The symbol commonly used to represent a Gorsedd is a triple line, the middle line upright and the outer two slanted towards the top of the centre, thus: /|\. This symbol, called "awen", is often explained as representing the sun. The word "awen" means "muse" in Welsh.

See also

 Archdruid (includes a chronological list of Archdruids of Wales)
 Gorsedd Cymru (Welsh Gorsedd)
 Gorsedh Kernow (Cornish Gorsedd)
 Goursez Vreizh (Breton Gorsedd)
 Gorsedd stones
 Order of Bards, Ovates and Druids
 Oireachtas na Gaeilge
 Mòd

References

1792 establishments in Wales
 
Eisteddfod
Poetry organizations